The Honorable Mr. Buggs is a 1927 American silent comedy film featuring Anna May Wong and Oliver Hardy. This film is held by a private owner.

Plot

Cast
 Matt Moore as Mr. Buggs
 Anna May Wong as Baroness Stoloff
 Sōjin Kamiyama as A crook
 Oliver Hardy as Butler
 Martha Sleeper as The fiancée
 Laura La Varnie
 Tyler Brooke
 Priscilla Dean
 James Finlayson

See also
 List of American films of 1927
 Oliver Hardy filmography

References

External links

1927 films
1927 short films
1927 comedy films
American silent short films
Silent American comedy films
American black-and-white films
American comedy short films
Films directed by Fred Jackman
1920s American films